Zerbini is an Italian surname. Notable people with the surname include:

Luciano Zerbini (born 1960), Italian discus thrower and shot putter
Therezinha Zerbini (1928–2015), Brazilian attorney and feminist
Euryclides de Jesus Zerbini (1912–1993), Brazilian physician and cardiac surgeon

Italian-language surnames